All singing, all dancing is an idiom meaning "full of vitality", or, more recently, "full-featured". It originated with advertisements for the 1929 musical film The Broadway Melody, which proclaimed the film to be "All talking all singing all dancing".

Recently, the idiom has come to be used to describe high tech gadgetry such as smartphones, indicating that the product is very advanced, or has an abundance of features. For example, from a 1995 article in The Daily Telegraph:

The phrase also appears in the 1996 novel Fight Club, and the 1999 film based on it, in which the character Tyler Durden excoriates his disciples: "You're the all singing, all dancing crap of the world."

A 1998 episode of The Simpsons was titled "All Singing, All Dancing".

See also

References

English-language idioms